Vincent Harris is an American conservative political strategist and the CEO of Harris Media, an online communications firm based in Miami, Florida.

Harris joined Mike Huckabee's 2008 Presidential campaign just a few months after it was announced, working as the campaign's official blogger. The following year, Harris served as Online Director for Bob Mc'Donnell's successful gubernatorial campaign. Mc'Donnell's online campaign considered highly successful, was one of the first major Republican campaigns to embrace social media.

Harris was active in the 2012 Presidential campaign. He first served as the online strategist for Rick Perry. After Perry dropped out of the race and endorsed Newt Gingrich, Harris was hired to help the Gingrich campaign's online and social media operations. In 2012, National Journal named him one of ten Republicans to follow on Twitter.

In 2012, Harris led the digital operations of Senator Ted Cruz's campaign. This digital campaign contributed in making Cruz the next U.S. Senator from Texas.

Working alongside Senator Mitch McConnell's 2014 campaign as lead digital director, Harris brought "a new era of social campaigning for Republicans" through social media integration.

Harris was hired by Senator Rand Paul's political operation, joining Senator Paul's 2016 team as the top digital strategist. Harris will sit at the "top of the leadership team" providing digital strategy expertise pertaining to data collection, website design and social media tactics, to name a few.

In 2015 Harris was reported to have been hired by the Likud Party to work on the re-election campaign for Israeli Prime Minister Benjamin Netanyahu.

Harris's work with Paul was not without criticism. In October 2015, Harris was behind Paul live-streaming an entire day on the campaign trail. By the end of the day, Paul had enough and called it a "dumbass livestream." The comment from Paul brought about a flurry of negative attention to an already slumped campaign.

In June 2016, POLITICO reported that Donald Trump's presidential campaign had hired Harris and his team to work for the campaign. 
Harris is currently attending the University of Texas working towards his PhD.

References 

American political consultants
Living people
Year of birth missing (living people)